B. Venkatarama Reddy ( – 12 May 2019, also written as B. Venkatarami Reddy) was an Indian film producer who produced many Tamil and Telugu films.

Biography
Reddy was the youngest son of B. Nagi Reddy. He produced films like Bhairava Dweepam, Sri Krishnarjuna Vijayam, Uzhaippali, Thaamirabharani, Nammavar and Veeram.

Reddy was married to B. Bharathi Reddy. They had one son and two daughters.

Reddy died on 12 May 2019 at the age of 75.

Selected filmography

Tamil
 Uzhaippali (1993)
 Nammavar (1994)
 Thaamirabharani (2007)
 Padikkadavan (2009)
 Venghai (2011)
 Veeram (2014)
 Bairavaa (2017)
 Sangathamizhan (2019)

Telugu
 Brundavanam (1993)
 Bhairava Dweepam (1994)
 Sri Krishnarjuna Vijayam (1996)

Awards
 He won Nandi Award for Third Best Feature Film - Bronze - Bhairava Dweepam (1994)

References

Telugu film producers
2019 deaths
Tamil film producers
1940s births